Roseomitra tagaroae is a species of sea snail, a marine gastropod mollusk in the family Mitridae, the miters or miter snails.

Description
The length of the shell attains 9.7 mm.

Distribution
This marine species occurs off the Philippines.

References

 Poppe G.T. (2008) New Fissurellidae, Epitoniidae, Aclididae, Mitridae and Costellariidae from the Philippines. Visaya 2(3): 37-63.

External links
 Fedosov A., Puillandre N., Herrmann M., Kantor Yu., Oliverio M., Dgebuadze P., Modica M.V. & Bouchet P. (2018). The collapse of Mitra: molecular systematics and morphology of the Mitridae (Gastropoda: Neogastropoda). Zoological Journal of the Linnean Society. 183(2): 253-337

Mitridae
Gastropods described in 2008